Circle Hot Springs Airport  is a state-owned public-use airport serving Circle Hot Springs, in the Yukon-Koyukuk Census Area of the U.S. state of Alaska.

Facilities and aircraft 
It has one runway designated 8/26 with a gravel surface measuring 3,650 by 80 feet (1,113 x 24 m). For the 12-month period ending December 31, 2005, the airport had 3,600 aircraft operations, an average of 300 per month: 72% general aviation and 28% air taxi.

References

External links 
 FAA Alaska airport diagram (GIF)

Airports in the Yukon–Koyukuk Census Area, Alaska